Étienne Monier (20 April 1889 – 21 April 1913), also known as Élie Monier and nicknamed Simentoff, was a French anarchist and member of the infamous Bonnot Gang.

Life 
Étienne Monier was born into a family of winegrowers in Estagel, in Pyrénées-Orientales, a small town with a strong anarchist tradition since the local population resisted Napoléon III taking power in 1851. Monier started by learning to become a gardener and a florist, before deciding to move to Paris in 1909. At the end of 1910, refusing to fulfill his military service, he was forced to flee abroad. To be able to come back in France, he used the papers of an anarchist friend, Samuelis Simentoff, born in 1887 in Turkey. Back in Paris, he met Victor Serge and Rirette Maîtrejean and, later, Jules Bonnot, leading him to become a member of the Bonnot Gang.

On 25 March 1912, the gang, including Étienne Monier, stole a de Dion-Bouton automobile in the Forest of Sénart south of Paris by shooting the driver through the heart. They drove into Chantilly, north of Paris, where they robbed the local branch of the Société Générale bankshooting the bank's three cashiers. They escaped in their stolen automobile as two policemen tried to catch them, one on horseback and the other on a bicycle.

Étienne Monier then worked for some time in Antoine Gauzy's shop in Ivry-sur-Seine. Gauzy gave shelter to Bonnot later, sent by Monier and not knowing clearly his real identity. When the police came to Gauzy's shop on 24 April 1912, Bonnot killed Louis Jouin, the vice-chief of the French police, and escaped. On the same day, Monier was arrested in Belleville, in Paris.

The trial of the gang's survivors began on 3 February 1913. Monier was sentenced to death with André Soudy and Raymond Callemin. All three were guillotined on 21 April 1913.

References

1889 births
1913 deaths
People from Pyrénées-Orientales
Illegalists
French anarchists
French bank robbers
French gangsters
Executed anarchists
People executed by France by guillotine
People executed for robbery